Sonampreet Bajwa (born 16 August 1989) is an Indian model and actress who predominantly appears in Punjabi language films, alongside few Hindi films. In addition to few Tamil and Telugu films.  She participated in the Femina Miss India contest in 2012. Sonam Bajwa started her acting career in 2013 with the Punjabi film Best Of Luck. She played the leading female role in the 2014 film Punjab 1984. She won the PTC Punjabi Film Awards for Best Actress in 2020 for Ardab Mutiyaran.

Early life and career 
Bajwa was born on 16 August 1989 in Nainital and is a Punjabi. She studied at Delhi University. She moved to Mumbai in 2012, she participated in the Femina Miss India contest. She became an air hostess and pursued a career in acting.

She debuted with the Punjabi film Best Of Luck (2013) and played the female lead in period drama Punjab 1984 (2014). She has also appeared in Tamil romantic comedy Kappal in 2014.

She was nominated for the PTC Punjabi Film Awards for Best Actress award for Carry on Jatta 2 in 2019 and won it in 2020 for Ardab Mutiyaran.

Media 
Bajwa was ranked at No. 1 in the Chandigarh Times Most Desirable Woman in 2016, at No. 1 in 2017, at No. 2 in 2018, at No. 1 in 2019, at No. 4 in 2020.

Filmography

Films
 All films are in Punjabi, otherwise noted

Television

Music videos

References

External links 

 
 
 

1989 births
Living people
Indian people
21st-century Indian actresses
Indian female models
Indian film actresses
Actresses in Hindi cinema
Actresses in Tamil cinema
Actresses in Punjabi cinema
Actresses from Mumbai
Actresses from Uttarakhand
People from Nainital
Indian women
Punjabi people